Plecodus elaviae is a species of cichlid endemic to Lake Tanganyika. This schooling species is a scale-eater, plucking scales from other fishes.  Both parents care for the offspring in this mouthbrooder.  This fish can reach a length of  TL.

References

elaviae
Taxa named by Max Poll
Fish described in 1949
Taxonomy articles created by Polbot